Bombycilaena is a genus of flowering plants in the family Asteraceae. They are native to Europe, North Africa, southwestern Asia, + western North America.

 species
 Bombycilaena californica - California, Oregon, Baja California
 Bombycilaena discolor - Mediterranean + southwest Asia from Spain + Morocco to Iran
 Bombycilaena erecta - Europe, + southwest Asia from Portugal + Morocco to Ukraine + Afghanistan

References

Gnaphalieae
Asteraceae genera